Zafar Iqbal (born 12 June 1956) is a former Indian field hockey player and captain of the India national team.

Early life 
Zafar Iqbal was born on 12 June 1956 to Mohammed Shahabuddin Ahmed, a professor in the Aligarh Muslim University (AMU), and Najmun Nisha, as the third of their five children. He was born in Hargawan, a village in Bihar Sharif, in the Indian State of Bihar. His family moved to Aligarh, Uttar Pradesh where he was brought up. Iqbal started out playing football as child, before taking to hockey in 1969–70 encouraged by his father's colleague and hockey enthusiast, Professor Khan. He was mentored by Swami Jagan Nath, hockey coach of the AMU during that time and manager of India national team during the 1936 Berlin Olympics. Alongside hockey, Iqbal pursued a degree in civil engineering from AMU graduating in 1978 securing 74 per cent marks.

Professional career 
Iqbal was selected for the combined university trials after being selected on back of good performances during the inter-university games; Zafar playing for AMU. Iqbal good performances against the India national team which included scoring a goal against Leslie Fernandez prompted his selection to the national team for its tour of Netherlands in 1977. Iqbal till that point had always played in the left-in position, but was asked by coach Kishan Lal to play left-out because Surinder Singh Sodhi played in the former.

Iqbal played at the Asian Games in 1978 at Bangkok and was the captain of the team at New Delhi in 1982, winning the silver medal in both. The crowning glory of his illustrious career in hockey came to him in 1980 when he represented India at the Moscow Olympics and brought home the gold medal after a long hiatus. Further, he had the honour of carrying the Indian Tricolour of the Indian squad at the opening ceremony of the Los Angeles Olympics 1984. He also won the bronze medal for the country at the Champion's Trophy 1982 in Holland and won many other tournaments against Pakistan, Malaysia, Australia, New Zealand, West Germany and other European nations.

Achievements
His extraordinary game as “Left Out” in the Indian blue jersey with the number 11 embossed at the back is a glorious part of the history of Indian Hockey. After hanging his hockey sticks he immersed himself in coaching as the Chief National Coach, head Coach and National Selector for the Indian hockey squad. The team coached by him won the silver medal at the Asian Games in Hiroshima in 1994.

Mr. Zafar Iqbal is a strong proponent of hard work, team spirit, camaraderie and symbiotic partnership amongst team members. He stresses upon the adoption of modern innovations like sports physiology and psychology in Indian sports administration. He also believes that universities are the nurseries for talent, honing them to represent the country and he has contributed time and again to AMU, making it a nurturing ground for budding talent. Widely and rightly acknowledged by the print and electronic media as the ‘Gentleman of Hockey.

The country conferred Mr. Zafar Iqbal with the highest honour for a sportsman, the “Arjuna Award” in 1983. In 2012, the President of India honoured him with the “Padma Shri” for his invaluable services and the U. P. Government gave him the highest citizen award of the state, “Yash Bharti” in 1994. He was felicitated at the ‘Golden Greats’ platform by ‘Hockey India’ along with 34 other Olympic Gold Medalists in 2012. In recognition of his indispensable services to the nation, Aligarh Nagar Nigam has befittingly named a road after him and in 2013, in honour of his commitment to the revival of hockey at AMU, the university presented him with the D.Litt. Honoris Causa at its 60th Annual Convocation.

See also
List of Indian hockey captains in Olympics
Field hockey in India

References

External links
 
IndiaTimes Sports interview

Olympic field hockey players of India
1956 births
Living people
Olympic gold medalists for India
Sportspeople from Aligarh
Aligarh Muslim University alumni
Recipients of the Arjuna Award
Olympic medalists in field hockey
Field hockey players from Uttar Pradesh
Recipients of the Padma Shri in sports
Indian male field hockey players
Medalists at the 1980 Summer Olympics
Asian Games medalists in field hockey
Field hockey players at the 1980 Summer Olympics
Field hockey players at the 1984 Summer Olympics
Field hockey players at the 1978 Asian Games
Field hockey players at the 1982 Asian Games
Asian Games silver medalists for India
Medalists at the 1978 Asian Games
Medalists at the 1982 Asian Games